Bluewaters Power Station was the first privately owned, coal-fired power station in Western Australia. It was built by Griffin Energy in 2009 and is the newest coal-fired power station in Australia.

The plant consists of two 208 megawatts units, running on sub-bituminous coal. The boilers were constructed by IHI while the turbines and generators were supplied by Alstom.  EPC contractors were Mitsui and Hitachi Plant Technologies.

Griffin Coal appointed administrators KordaMentha after financial difficulty in 2009, however the power station continued to operate until its purchase by Sumitomo Group and Kansai Electric in 2013. , the power station "supplies about 15 per cent of the electricity used in" the South West Interconnected System, Western Australia's main power grid. In December 2022 the Government of Western Australia announced a grant to the receivers and managers of the insolvent coal mine Griffin Coal to enable it to continue supplying the power station over the Western Australian summer.

Community consultation commenced in 2009 for a proposed expansion and the WA Government approved it in 2010.  The proposal is to add two identical units and bring the capacity of the plant to 830 megawatts. As of 2018 it remains on hold, with two years remaining until they are required to re-apply for approvals. In 2020, the owners wrote "down the value of" their asset "to zero, wiping out a $1.2 billion investment in the face of an onslaught of renewable energy."

References

Coal-fired power stations in Western Australia
South West (Western Australia)